Tenkasi Junction railway station is a junction railway station serving the town of Tenkasi in the Indian state of Tamil Nadu. The station is a part of the Madurai railway division of the Southern Railway zone. It is the junction point for Virudhunagar and Tirunelveli rail routes.

Location and layout 
The railway station is located in the Railway feeder road of Tenkasi.

Lines 
An additional line branches out east-bound to  via Ambasamudram.

The lines branching out from Tenkasi Junction are:

 BG single line towards north –  via Rajapalayam, 
 BG single line towards east –  via Ambasamudram.
 BG single line towards west –  via Punalur.

References

External links 

 

Madurai railway division
Railway stations in Tirunelveli district
Railway junction stations in Tamil Nadu